The President of the House of Representatives is the presiding officer of the Yemeni legislature. Below is a list of office-holders:

Presidents of Yemen Arab Republic legislature 1969-1990

See also
 Supreme People's Council (South Yemen) - Legislature of South Yemen

References

Politics of Yemen
Yemen, House of Representatives
Speakers of the House of Representatives (Yemen)
Government of Yemen